RKT may refer to:

 IATA code for Ras Al Khaimah International Airport in the United Arab Emirates
 Reichskommissariat Turkestan (RKT) a projected Reichskommissariat
 RKT Music, a youth demographic sub-label of Rocketown Records
 Rice Krispies Treats

rkt may refer to:
 rkt (software), part of Container Linux, competitor with Docker software
 rkt, ISO 639 language code for the Kamtapuri language